Alexander Valentinovich Novak (born 23 August 1971) is a Russian politician who is the current Deputy Prime Minister of Russia since November 2020.

Previously, he was the Minister of Energy of Russia between 2012 and 2020, before being replaced in November 2020 by the general director of RusHydro, Nikolay Shulginov.

Career 
In 1993, he graduated from Norilsk Industrial Institute as a specialist on Economy and Management in Metallurgy. 

Between 1993 and 1997, he was Head of the Financial Bureau of the Accounting Department of the Norilsk Mining and Smelting Complex. In 1997 to 1999, he headed the tax planning department of the complex.

Entry into local and regional politics (2000-2008)
From 2000 to 2002, he was Norilsk Deputy Mayor for economics and finance, Norilsk's first Deputy Mayor. Between 2002 and 2007, he was head of the Main Finance Management of the Krasnoyarsk Krai Administration, Deputy Governor of the Krasnoyarsk Krai and Head of the Main Finance Authority of the Krasnoyarsk Krai.

Federal civil servant (2008-2012)
From September 2008 to May 2012, he was Deputy Finance Minister of the Russian Federation.

Federal politician (2012-present)
In May 2012, he was appointed as the Energy Minister in Dmitry Medvedev's Cabinet.

On 15 January 2020, Medvedev resigned his cabinet after President Vladimir Putin delivered the Presidential Address to the Federal Assembly, in which the latter proposed several amendments to the constitution.

On 21 January 2020, he obtained the position Energy Minister in Mikhail Mishustin's Cabinet.

On 10 November 2020, Mishustin exchanged his Energy Ministry post for the Deputy Prime Minister for the Fuel–Energy Complex.

Novak was a keynote speaker at the 2022 Russian Energy Week forum, which was held in Moscow from 12-14 October.

Personal life 
On 18 August 2020, Russian Prime Minister Mikhail Mishustin announced that Novak tested positive for COVID-19.

Awards, honours and directorships 
In 2004, he was distinguished by the Governor of the Krasnoyarsk Krai. In 2006, he was rewarded with the medal "For Distinguished Service in Organizing the All-Russia Agricultural Census 2006" of the Russian Federal Statistics Service.

Since July 2010, he has been a member of United Aircraft Corporation Board of Directors.

References 

1971 births
People from Avdiivka
Ukrainian emigrants to Russia
Energy ministers of Russia
United Russia politicians
21st-century Russian politicians
Living people
Moscow State University alumni
Deputy heads of government of the Russian Federation
People from Norilsk